Brad Fernquist is a professional touring and studio guitarist. Fernquist is primarily known for his work with Buffalo, New York based rock band the Goo Goo Dolls. At 17 years old Fernquist began touring with regional cover bands where he was able to develop his technique, and perfect his tone. Brad attended  Berklee College of Music in Boston, Massachusetts for one semester but left the school after his gigging schedule started to grow.

Fernquist has become a well known sidemen in pop/rock music. His first audition was with popular 1990s rock group The New Radicals with whom he toured extensively. Since leaving the New Radicals Fernquist toured with Fastball, Hilary Duff, Lisa Marie Presley, Bonnie McKee, and most notably Michelle Branch.

While not on the road Fernquist works as a session guitarist. He played most of the lead guitar on Paul Stanley's "Live to Win" album. In early 2006 Brad joined the Goo Goo Dolls for their extensive "Let Love In" tour which kept him out on the road for the better part of 2 years. Brad is currently in the studio working with the Goo Goo Dolls on their forthcoming CD.

Gear
Fernquist's distinguished modern guitar sound is accomplished through his use of Gibson and Fender guitars, and Divided by 13 amplifiers. He also uses many different effect by companies such as Catalinbread, Xotic Effects, Real McCoy Custom, Line 6, and Fulltone.
He also uses D'Addario Strings

External links
 
 Profile at glam-metal.com
 FPE Interview

American rock guitarists
American male guitarists
Living people
Berklee College of Music alumni
Place of birth missing (living people)
Year of birth missing (living people)
Guitarists from Los Angeles